Ameryka  (German: Amerika) is a village in northern Poland, close to the Baltic Sea coast. 

It lies in the administrative district of Gmina Główczyce, within Słupsk County, Pomeranian Voivodeship. 

See also
History of Pomerania

References

Villages in Słupsk County